Edgar Wenzel (1919–1980) was a Romanian-born German actor.

Selected filmography
 The Scarlet Baroness (1959)
 Snow White and the Seven Jugglers (1962)
 The Puzzle of the Red Orchid (1962)
 The Seventh Victim (1964)
 Hugo, the Woman Chaser  (1969)
 Aunt Trude from Buxtehude (1971)
 Charley's Nieces (1974)

References

Bibliography
 Tom Johnson & Mark A. Miller. The Christopher Lee Filmography: All Theatrical Releases, 1948-2003. McFarland & Company, 2004.

External links

1919 births
1980 deaths
People from Brașov
Romanian male television actors
Romanian male film actors
German male television actors
German male film actors
German people of German-Romanian descent
Romanian emigrants to Germany